Miljan Vuković (born 10 January 1990 in Belgrade) is a Serbian rower. He represented Serbia at the 2012 Summer Olympics.

Vuković is a member of Partizan Rowing Club.

Results

Olympic games
 2012 - Coxless four - 10th place

World Championship
 2011 - Coxless four - 11th place

European Championship
 2010 - Coxless four - 6th place
 2011 - Coxless four - 6th place
 2012 - Coxless four -

World U23 Championship
 2009 - Coxless fours - 9th place

World Junior Championship
 2008 - Quadruple scull - 4th place

References

1990 births
Living people
Serbian male rowers
Olympic rowers of Serbia
Rowers at the 2012 Summer Olympics
Sportspeople from Belgrade
European Rowing Championships medalists